Robin Jenkins (born July 20, 1959, in Woodruff, Wisconsin) is a game designer who has worked primarily on role-playing games.

Early life and education
Robin Jenkins was born July 20, 1959, in Woodruff, Wisconsin. His family moved across the country from coast to coast, but eventually returned to Wisconsin, where he finished high school at La Crosse. Jenkins held a position as a journalist for his high-school newspaper — with additional responsibilities as the paper's photo editor, city editor, school editor, and editor-in-chief, and he commented: "I used to write out articles on the bus on the way to the printer".

Jenkins went on to the University of Wisconsin–La Crosse, but comments that "I did so well that I was asked to take a year's vacation to decide if college was where I really wanted to be." Jenkins became the director for a science-fiction convention that hosted A.E. Van Vogt one year: "We decided to call it Attempt-A-Con because of all the problems we were having with it." After a year spent in factory work, Jenkins returned to campus and became the Assistant Arts Editor for the Racquet (the college newspaper), the secretary for Sigma Pi Fraternity, the vicechairman of the Lectures and Concerts Committee, and the chairman of the Video Committee. He developed a sudden interest in early science-fiction and horror films such as Metropolis and Nosferatu. He graduated with honors in English (the first to do so in the five-year history of the program) and with a minor in photography.

Jenkins acquired jobs as a color printer and as a news cameraman for WXOW TV-19 in La Crosse, with additional responsibilities in photography, film production, and commercial making. He moved to Madison, where he became a color printer for a photo lab and freelanced articles to regional business magazines and newspapers.

Career
Robin Jenkins saw an ad in a local paper for an assistant editorship at Dragon Magazine. A gamer since 1976, he applied at TSR, Inc., in May 1986 and got the job shortly thereafter. Avalon Hill later hired Jenkins as a managing editor of roleplaying designs, where he oversaw both Tales from the Floating Vagabond and RuneQuest. Jenkins later became a full-time employee of Atlas Games.

His Dungeons & Dragons work includes Twilight Calling (1986), Five Coins for a Kingdom (1987), The Book of Lairs II (1987), and Country Sites (1995).

References

External links
 

1959 births
Atlas Games people
Dungeons & Dragons game designers
Living people
People from Woodruff, Wisconsin
University of Wisconsin–La Crosse alumni